The 38 cm SK C/34 naval gun was developed by Germany mid to late 1930s. It armed the s and was planned as the armament of the s and the re-armed s. Six twin-gun mountings were also sold to the Soviet Union and it was planned to use them on the s, however they were never delivered. Spare guns were used as coastal artillery in Denmark, Norway and France. One gun and one barrel is currently on display at respectively Møvig Fortress outside Kristiansand and Bunkermuseum Hanstholm, Denmark.

Ammunition
It used the standard German naval system of ammunition where the base charge was held in a metallic cartridge case and supplemented by another charge in a silk bag. Both cartridges were rammed together.

Propellant charge
Main charge: 38 cm HuelsKart34 – GefLdG –  RP C/38 (16/7)

Fore charge: 38 cm VorKart34 – GefLdG –  RP C/38 (16/7)

Shell

Four types of shells were used by the 38 cm SK C/34 although the Siegfried-Granate could only be used by the coast defense versions. With a full charge it reached  and could travel  – over 34 miles.

Naval gun
The data given is according to Krupp datasheet 38 cm S.K.C/34 e WA52-453(e). This gun was mounted in pairs in the Drh.L. C/34e turret which allowed elevation from -5° 30' to +30°. In general the turret was hydraulically powered, but the training gear, auxiliary elevation, auxiliary hoists and some loading gear was electrically powered. The guns were loaded at +2.5° and used a telescoping chain-operated rammer. According to German manuals  the required permanent capacity for the loading equipment for ammunition was 2.5 shells per minute. During testing period at the Baltic Sea the AVKS Report states an output of the ammunition delivery system up to 3.125 shells per minute.

Turret armor

Numbers
Six were intended for each of the s, but it is uncertain how many of these last were actually delivered. Six mountings with twelve guns were sold to the Soviet Union who planned to use them on two s, but these were never delivered. Surplus guns were used as coast defense guns.

Anti-aircraft
During repairs after Operation Tungsten, the 38 cm SK C/34 naval guns of the  Tirpitz were modified to allow their use against aircraft, being supplied with specially-fuzed 38 cm shells for barrage anti aircraft fire, in a manner similar to the Japanese San Shiki "Beehive" shells fired by the Yamato-class and other battleships. Tirpitz fired her main battery against Royal Navy Fleet Air Arm aircraft in Operations Planet, Brawn, Tiger Claw, Mascot and Goodwood. In Operations Paravane, Obviate, and Catechism, Tirpitzs 38 cm fragmentation shells proved ineffective in countering the Royal Air Force's high-level bombers.

Coast defense gun

These guns were modified with a larger chamber for coast defense duties to handle the increased amount of propellant used for the special long-range Siegfried shells. An armored single mount, the Bettungsschiessgerüst ("Firing platform") C/39 was used by these guns. It had a maximum elevation of 60° and could traverse up to 360°, depending on the emplacement. The C/39 mount had two compartments; the upper housed the guns and their loading equipment, while the lower contained the ammunition hoists, their motors, and the elevation and traverse motors. The mount was fully powered and had an underground magazine. This had the effect of limiting their traverse to 120°. Other C/39 mounts were installed at the Hanstholm fortress in Denmark, and the Vara fortress in Kristiansand, Norway.

Four Drh LC/34 turrets, three of which were originally intended to re-arm the Gneisenau and one completed to the Soviet order, modified for land service, were planned to be emplaced at Paimpol, Brittany and on the Cap de la Hague on the Cotentin Peninsula, but construction never actually began. Construction for two of those turrets was well underway at Blaavand-Oksby, Denmark when the war ended.

Railroad gun

Some guns also saw service as 38 cm Siegfried K (E) railroad guns, one of these being captured by American forces during the Rhône Valley campaign in 1944.

History
The first time these guns were used in combat was when the German battleship sailed out to hunt convoys alongside the heavy cruiser Prinz Eugen in May 1941. Enroute was countered by the British heavy cruisers Norfolk and Suffolk, where 38-cm gun were fired in anger for the first time in the war, warding off the two heavy cruisers (although the blast of them disabled Bismarck's radar). Soon afterwards, the British battleships  and  engaged Bismarck, and Bismarck's guns were fired in anger again, sinking with a single hit. With Hood sunk, Bismarck turned her attention to Prince of Wales, hitting her three times and, alongside Prinz Eugen, sent her running off. They would be fired again when Bismarck was attacked by Fairey Swordfish torpedo bombers, where they were fired into the water to create massive splashes in order blow away the British bombers. After Bismarck sustained a rudder jam and she was attacked by the British battleships King George V and Rodney. They would be fired but would claim no hits as they were all destroyed by 14-inch (356 mm) and 16-inch (406 mm) gunfire.

A few years later, on September 7th, 1943, the German battleship Tirpitz used her 38-cm guns to bombard the island Spitzbergen. Fifty-two 38-cm shells were fired, and several shore instalments were destroyed, and 74 soldiers were killed.

Weapons of comparable role, performance and era
 380 mm/45 Modèle 1935 gun : French equivalent
 381mm / 50 Model 1934 naval gun : Italian equivalent
BL 15-inch Mk I naval gun

Notes

Citations

References

Service manuals and publications
 Krupp datasheet 38 cm S.K.C/34 WA52-444
 Krupp datasheet 38 cm S.K.C/34 e WA52-453(e)
 Bauvorschrift fuer den Schiffskoerper der Schlachtschiffe "F" und "G" ("Ersatz Hannover" und "Ersatz Schleswig-Holstein") O.K.M Archiv K I Nr. 20 Berlin, den 16.November 1936
 M.Dv.Nr.185, Heft 2, Abmessungen, Gewichte, Raumbedarf der Munition und ihrer Packgefäße
 Unterlagen und Richtlinien zur Bestimmung der Hauptkampfentfernung und der Geschoßwahl Heft a Textband
 Unterlagen und Richtlinien zur Bestimmung der Hauptkampfentfernung und der Geschoßwahl Heft h Eigene Durchschlagsangaben für Schlachtschiffe Bismarck, Tirpitz und Beispiele (G.Kdos 100)
 AVKS-700 Schlußbericht vom 31.05.1941, AVKS Erprobungen auf Schlachtschiff Bismarck

Literature

External links 

  page from Nav weapons.com
 Hanstholm Museum

World War II artillery of Germany
Naval guns of Germany
World War II naval weapons
380 mm artillery
Coastal artillery
Weapons and ammunition introduced in 1940